List of feature films distributed by the Triangle Film Corporation between 1915 and 1919. The company also released a number of short comedy films.

1915

1916
{| class="wikitable sortable"
|-
! Title
! Release Date
! Director
! Notes
|-
| Peggy || January 2, 1916 || Thomas H. Ince, Charles Giblyn || 
|-
| The Wood Nymph || January 2, 1916 || Paul Powell || 
|-
| Let Katie Do It || January 6, 1916 || Chester Franklin, Sidney Franklin ||
|-
| The Corner || January 9, 1916 || Walter Edwards ||
|-
| The Missing Links || January 16, 1916 || Lloyd Ingraham ||
|-
|  The Conqueror || January 23, 1916 || Reginald Barker ||
|-
| The Green Swamp || January 30, 1916 || Scott Sidney ||
|-
| Acquitted || February 6, 1916 || Paul Powell ||
|-
| The Three Musketeers || February 6, 1916 || Charles Swickard ||
|-
| His Picture in the Papers || February 13, 1916 || John Emerson ||
|-
| Honor's Altar || February 14, 1916 || Walter Edwards ||
|-
| Betty of Greystone || February 20, 1916 || Allan Dwan ||
|-
| Bullets and Brown Eyes || February 20, 1916 ||  Scott Sidney || 
|-
| Martha's Vindication || February 20, 1916 || Chester Franklin, Sidney Franklin ||
|-
| The Raiders || February 27, 1916 || Charles Swickard  ||
|-
| The Last Act || February 27, 1916 || Walter Edwards ||
|-
| Daphne and the Pirate || March 5, 1916 || Christy Cabanne ||
|-
| Hell's Hinges || March 5, 1916 || Charles Swickard ||
|-
| The Moral Fabric || March 5, 1916 || Raymond B. West ||
|-
| The Flying Torpedo || March 12, 1916 || John B. O'Brien, Christy Cabanne ||
|-
| The Habit of Happiness || March 12, 1916 || Allan Dwan ||
|-
| Hoodoo Ann || March 26, 1916 ||  Lloyd Ingraham || 
|-
| Little Meena's Romance || April 2, 1916 || Paul Powell ||
|-
| The Waifs || April 2, 1916 || Scott Sidney ||
|-
| The Aryan || April 9, 1916 || William S. Hart, Reginald Barker ||
|-
| The Good Bad-Man || April 13, 1916 || Allan Dwan ||
|-
| Sold for Marriage || April 16, 1916 || Christy Cabanne ||
|-
| The Stepping Stone || April 16, 1916 || Reginald Barker, Thomas H. Ince ||
|-
| Sunshine Dad || April 23, 1916 ||Edward Dillon ||
|-
| Civilization's Child || April 23, 1916 || Charles Giblyn ||
|-
| The Beggar of Cawnpore  || April 30, 1916 || Charles Swickard || 
|-
| The Bugle Call || April 30, 1916 || Reginald Barker ||
|-
| The Children in the House || April 30, 1916 || Chester Franklin, Sidney Franklin ||
|-
| The No-Good Guy || May 7, 1916 || Walter Edwards ||
|-
| Not My Sister || May 14, 1916 || Charles Giblyn || 
|-
| Susan Rocks the Boat || May 16, 1916 || Paul Powell ||
|-
| A Child of the Paris Streets || May 21, 1916 || Lloyd Ingraham ||
|-
| The Primal Lure || May 21, 1916 || William S. Hart || 
|-
| The Market of Vain Desire || May 28, 1916 || Reginald Barker || 
|-
| Reggie Mixes In || May 28, 1916 || Christy Cabanne || 
|-
| Mr. Goode, Samaritan || May 29, 1916 || Edward Dillon ||
|-
| Going Straight || June 4, 1916 || Chester Franklin, Sidney Franklin ||
|-
| Macbeth || June 4, 1916 || John Emerson ||
|-
| The Sorrows of Love || June 11, 1916 || Charles Giblyn  ||
|-
| The Dividend || June 18, 1916 || Walter Edwards, Thomas H. Ince || 
|-
| An Innocent Magdalene || June 18, 1916 || Allan Dwan ||
|-
| The Apostle of Vengeance || June 25, 1916 || Clifford Smith ||
|-
| Flirting with Fate || June 25, 1916 || Christy Cabanne |||
|-
| A Wild Girl of the Sierras || June 25, 1916 || Paul Powell || 
|-
| Casey at the Bat || July 2, 1916 || Lloyd Ingraham ||
|-
| The Phantom || July 2, 1916 || Charles Giblyn ||
|-
| The Deserter || July 9, 1916 || Walter Edwards ||
|-
| Eye of the Night || July 16, 1916 || Walter Edwards ||
|-
| The Little School Ma'am || July 16, 1916 || Chester Franklin, Sidney Franklin ||
|-
| The Captive God || July 23, 1916 || Charles Swickard ||
|-
| Stranded || July 23, 1916 || Lloyd Ingraham ||
|-
| The Half-Breed || July 30, 1916 || Allan Dwan || 
|-
| The Payment || July 30, 1916 || Raymond B. West ||
|-
| Home || July 30, 1916 || Raymond B. West ||
|-
|  Honor Thy Name || August 6, 1916 || Charles Giblyn ||
|-
| The Marriage of Molly-O' || August 6, 1916 || Paul Powell ||
|-
| The Devil's Needle || August 13, 1916 || Chester Withey || 
|-
| Shell 43 || August 13, 1916 || Reginald Barker || 
|-
| Hell-to-Pay Austin || August 20, 1916 || Paul Powell ||
|-
| Lieutenant Danny, U.S.A || August 20, 1916 || Walter Edwards ||
|-
| Pillars of Society || August 27, 1916 || Raoul Walsh ||
|-
| Gretchen the Greenhorn || September 3, 1916 || Chester Franklin, Sidney Franklin ||
|-
| The Patriot || September 3, 1916 || William S. Hart ||
|-
| Intolerance || September 5, 1916|| D. W. Griffith ||
|-
| The Little Liar || September 10, 1916 || Lloyd Ingraham ||
|-
| Manhattan Madness || September 10, 1916 || Allan Dwan ||
|-
| The Thoroughbred || September 10, 1916 || Reginald Barker || 
|-
| The Wolf Woman || September 17, 1916 || Raymond B. West ||
|-
| The Dawn Maker || September 24, 1916 || William S. Hart || 
|-
| Diane of the Follies || September 24, 1916 || Christy Cabanne ||
|-
| The Jungle Child || October 1, 1916 || Walter Edwards ||
|-
| Plain Jane || October 8, 1916 || Charles Miller ||
|-
| The Rummy || October 8, 1916 || Paul Powell  || 
|-
| The Old Folks at Home || October 15, 1916|| Chester Withey ||
|-
| The Return of Draw Egan || October 15, 1916 || William S. Hart || 
|-
| Fifty-Fifty || October 22, 1916 || Allan Dwan || 
|-
| The Vagabond Prince || October 22, 1916 || Charles Giblyn  ||
|-
| A Sister of Six || October 29, 1916 || Chester Franklin, Sidney Franklin ||
|-
| Somewhere in France || October 29, 1916 || Charles Giblyn  ||
|-
| American Aristocracy || November 5, 1916 || Lloyd Ingraham || 
|-
| Atta Boy's Last Race || November 5, 1916 || George Siegmann  ||
|-
| A Corner in Colleens  || November 5, 1916 || Charles Miller ||
|-
| Jim Grimsby's Boy || November 12, 1916 ||  Reginald Barker ||
|-
| The Microscope Mystery || November 19, 1916 || Paul Powell || 
|-
| The Honorable Algy || November 19, 1916 || Raymond B. West ||
|-
| The Children Pay || November 26, 1919 || Lloyd Ingraham|| 
|-
| The Devil's Double || November 26, 1919 || William S. Hart || 
|-
| Children of the Feud || December 2, 1916 ||  Joseph Henabery ||
|-
| The Criminal || December 2, 1916 ||  Reginald Barker ||
|-
| The Wharf Rat || December 9, 1916 || Chester Withey |||
|-
| Bawbs O' Blue Ridge || December 9, 1916 || Charles Miller||
|-
| A Gamble in Souls || December 9, 1916 || Walter Edwards||
|-
| The Matrimaniac || December 16, 1916 || Paul Powell ||
|-
| The Sin Ye Do || December 16, 1916 || Walter Edwards ||
|-
| The Heiress at Coffee Dan's || December 23, 1916 || Edward Dillon||
|-
| The Americano || December 24, 1916 || John Emerson||
|-
| Three of Many || December 24, 1916 || Reginald Barker ||
|-
| The House Built Upon Sand || December 31, 1916 || Edward Morrissey ||
|}

1917

1918

1919

Bibliography
 Munden, Kenneth White. The American Film Institute Catalog of Motion Pictures Produced in the United States, Part 1''. University of California Press, 1997.

Triangle Film Corporation films
Triangle Film Corporation
Triangle Film Corporation